Dar al-Mustafa is a Yemeni Islamic university based in Tarim, Hadhramaut.

History
In 1993, the Islamic seminary was founded by Habib Umar bin Hafiz. The Dar al-Mustafa campus was officially opened in May 1997 and incorporated as a center for traditional Islamic scholarship.

In 2007, there were 250 students from various countries studying at the school. In 2009, the school had approximately 700 students, most of whom were aged between 18 and 25.

As a result of the school's popularity, East Tarim has continued to grow as there has been an influx of students and spiritual leaders relocating to the region with their families.

Methodology
The education at Dar al-Mustafa follows the methodology of traditional Islamic studies teaching in Arabic. Studies are focused on Islamic jurisprudence, Arabic grammar, Islamic theology, Qur'anic memorization, Qur'anic exegesis, prophetic traditions and sciences of the heart. The curriculum is designed so that an average student can complete all of the core classes in a period of four years.

Every year, the school organises summer courses for 40 days between July and August, known as "The Dowra".

See also
Al-Azhar University
Zaytuna College

References

External links

Further reading
Zand, Bernhard. "Are Koran Schools Hotbeds of Terrorism?". Der Spiegel. March 20, 2007

Educational institutions established in 1997
Madrasas in Yemen
Islamic universities and colleges in Yemen
1997 establishments in Yemen